The following are the records of Slovenia in Olympic weightlifting. Records are maintained in each weight class for the snatch lift, clean and jerk lift, and the total for both lifts by the Weightlifting Federation of Slovenia.

Men

Women

References

records
Slovenia
Olympic weightlifting
weightlifting